Agyneta pogonophora is a species of sheet weaver found in Angola and Seychelles. It was described by Locket in 1968.

References

pogonophora
Spiders of Africa
Fauna of Seychelles
Invertebrates of Angola
Spiders described in 1968